Fabio Ricardo Diez Steinaker (born 18 November 1965 in Santa Fe) is a former male beach volleyball player, who represented Spain at the 2000 Summer Olympics. Alongside Javier Bosma he won the silver medal at the 1999 European Championships in Palma de Mallorca.
3 times Spanish Champion, Argentinean Sub Champion, 3 times bronze medal in International World Tour Fivb.

References

 
 www.fabiodiez.com or www.personalpro.es

External links
 
 
 
 

1965 births
Living people
Spanish beach volleyball players
Men's beach volleyball players
Beach volleyball players at the 2000 Summer Olympics
Olympic beach volleyball players of Spain
Argentine people of Spanish descent